Andrea's keelback (Hebius andreae) is a species of nonvenomous colubrid snake endemic to Vietnam.

Etymology
The specific name, andreae, is in honor of Andrea Ziegler, wife of German herpetologist Thomas Ziegler.

Geographic range
H. andreae is found in the central Annamite Range in Vietnam.

Habitat

Discovery
Only one specimen of H. andreae has ever been examined and photographed. In 2006, Thomas Ziegler and Le Khac Quyet, captured a male in the area of Phong Nha-Kẻ Bàng National Park whose coloring was distinct enough from other known keelbacks to be described as a newly discovered species. There has been one bite recorded from this species on Bharathi Pochu.

Reproduction
H. andreae is oviparous.

References

Hebius
Snakes of Vietnam
Snakes of Asia
Reptiles described in 2006
Reptiles of Vietnam